The 1970 United States Senate election in Nebraska took place on November 3, 1970. The incumbent Republican Senator, Roman Hruska, was re-elected, albeit with a reduced majority. He defeated the former Governor of Nebraska Frank B. Morrison. This race was a rematch of the 1958 race; when Hruska defeated Morrison to win his first full term in the Senate.

Democratic primary

Candidates
Frank B. Morrison, former Governor of Nebraska
Wallace C. Peterson, professor at the University of Nebraska–Lincoln

Results

Republican primary

Candidates
Otis Glebe, perennial candidate
Roman Hruska, the incumbent Senator

Results

Results

References 

1970
Nebraska
United States Senate